Rothco is a creative and advertising agency based in Dublin, Ireland. The agency was founded in 1995, employs more than 150 people, and was acquired by Accenture in December 2017.

Notable campaigns

AIB 

 ‘Mick and Kate’ – Rothco was the creative agency behind AIB's ‘Mick and Kate’ mortgage campaign. The campaign became notable in Ireland for its unusual approach to the subject of mortgages - in that it featured customers at the tail-end of the mortgage process, rather than the beginning.
 ‘The Toughest’ – Rothco's campaign for AIB to reposition the GAA Club Championships won several awards, spawned a series of TV specials, and was featured as a keynote talk during Cannes 2017.

Daintree Paper 

 ‘Shred of Decency’ – Ahead of the Irish Same-Sex Marriage Equality Referendum Rothco launched the Shred of Decency campaign to turn anti-same-sex marriage flyers into confetti for same-sex marriages. The campaign won a Bronze Cannes Lion in 2015.

Defence Forces 

 ‘A New Dawn’ - Rothco were the agency behind the Irish Defence Forces ‘A New Dawn’ campaign, a recruitment drive for 18-24 year olds. The campaign saw the Irish Defence Forces use the device of a ‘hyper-realistic’ first-person shooter game to attract over 3,600 applicants.

Tesco Ireland 

 ‘Big Can Be Good’ – Rothco sought to reposition Tesco Ireland by focusing on the brand's reputed benefits to Irish communities.

Awards and recognition
The company has won national and international awards In 2018 a Rothco representative spoke on the main stage for the fourth time at Cannes Lions International Festival of Creativity.
 Forbes - Top 100 Global Ad Agencies That Know Social Media and Google.
 2012 Silver Midas - Allied Irish Banks Small Business Support.
 2012 Webby Awards Honoree - O2 'Bring Back the Roar'.
 2013 APMC (Gold & 4 Silver); Love Radio Awards (Grand Prix)
 2014 Kinsale Sharks (14 sharks); AdFX (2 Gold); Marketing Society (Excellence Award)
 2015 Cannes Lions Festival of Creativity (Bronze); APMC (3 Gold & 3 Silver); An Post Marketing Awards (Grand Prix); ICAD (17 bells); Kinsale Sharks (21 sharks)
 2016 Cannes Lions Festival of Creativity (Silver); APMC (5 Gold & 6 Silver); An Post Marketing Awards (4 Gold & 3 Silver)’ ICAD (14 bells); AdFX (Grand Prix & 5 Gold)
 2018 Rothco won 117 international awards, including 7 Cannes Lions and the Grand Prix in the Creative Data category. They were also awarded Eurobest 'Agency of the Year'

References

External links
 

Irish companies established in 1995
Advertising agencies of Ireland
Companies based in Dublin (city)
Marketing companies established in 1995
Accenture